The United States National Security council was established following the coordination of the foreign policy system in the United States in 1947 under the National Security Act of 1947. An administrative agency guiding national security issues was found to be needed since world war II. The national Security Act of 1947 provides the council with powers of setting up and adjusting foreign policies and reconcile diplomatic and military establishments. It established a Secretary of Defence, a National Military Establishment which serves as central intelligence agency and a National Security Resources Board. The specific structure of the United States National Security Council can be different depending on the elected party of the time. Different party emphasize on different aspects of policy making and administrating. 

Since the end of World War II, each administration has sought to develop and perfect a reliable set of executive institutions to manage national security policy. Each President has tried to avoid the problems and deficiencies of his predecessors' efforts and install a policy-making and coordination system that reflected his personal management style. The United States National Security Council (NSC) has been at the center of this foreign policy coordination system, but it has changed many times to conform with the needs and inclinations of each succeeding chief executive.

The National Security Act of 1947 created the National Security Council under the chairmanship of the President, with the Secretaries of State and Defense as its key members, to coordinate foreign policy and defense policy, and to reconcile diplomatic and military commitments and requirements. This major legislation also provided for a Secretary of Defense, a National Military Establishment, Central Intelligence Agency, and National Security Resources Board. The view that the NSC had been created to coordinate political and military questions quickly gave way to the understanding that the NSC existed to serve the President alone. The view that the Council's role was to foster collegiality among departments also gave way to the need by successive Presidents to use the Council as a means of controlling and managing competing departments.

The structure and functioning of the NSC depended in no small degree upon the interpersonal chemistry between the President and his principal advisers and department heads. But despite the relationships between individuals, a satisfactory organizational structure had to be developed, for without it the necessary flow of information and implementation of decisions could not occur. Although a permanent staff gradually began to take shape, the main substantive work occurred in the departments.

President Truman's NSC was dominated by the Department of State. President Eisenhower's predilection for the military staff system, however, led to development of the NSC along those lines. The NSC staff coordinated an elaborate structure for monitoring the implementation of policies. The NSC's Executive Secretary became an assistant to the President, but was sufficiently self-effacing not to conflict with a powerful Secretary of State, John Foster Dulles.

President Kennedy may have initially looked to a strong Secretary of State to take charge of foreign policy-making, but turned to other strategies when it became apparent that the Department of State did not have sufficient authority over other departments. Kennedy, who preferred policy-making with ad hoc groups, dismantled Eisenhower's elaborate NSC machinery and allowed the Special Assistant for National Security Affairs and his staff to assume the primary coordination role. Kennedy's freewheeling style tended to erase the distinction between policy-making and operations that President Eisenhower's regimented staff system so carefully observed.

Sharing Kennedy's affinity for informal advisory arrangements, President Johnson let the NSC structure atrophy still further and, like his predecessor, relied instead on the National Security Adviser and his staff and various ad hoc groups and trusted friends. But he also consulted regularly with his Tuesday Lunch Group and in 1966 officially turned over responsibility for the supervision and coordination of interdepartmental activities overseas to the Secretary of State, with mixed results.

Under Presidents Nixon and Ford, Henry Kissinger's expanded NSC staff concentrated on acquiring analytical information from the various departments that would allow the National Security Adviser to put before the President the best possible range of options for decision. This system was in perfect accord with President Nixon's preference for detailed written expositions rather than interpersonal groupings. Kissinger concentrated on a handful of major issues and allowed some foreign matters to devolve by default on the Department of State, while weapons and international financial questions were dealt with by the Departments of Defense and the Treasury. Kissinger at first attempted to restore the separation between policy-making and implementation, but eventually found himself personally performing both roles.

Under President Carter, the National Security Adviser became a principal source of foreign affairs ideas and the NSC staff was recruited and managed with that in view. The Department of State provided institutional memory and served as operations coordinator. Some saw this as an activism-conservatism duality, and the press eventually picked up on the tensions that were present. The National Security Adviser's role as public advocate rather than as custodian exacerbated the difficult relationships with State and other departments.

A collegial approach to government decision-making was emphasized in the Reagan administration. The National Security Adviser was downgraded, and the Chief of Staff to the President exercised a coordinating role in the White House. The collegiality among powerful department heads was not successfully maintained and conflicts became public. The NSC staff tended to emerge as a separate, contending party.

President Bush brought his own considerable foreign policy experience to his leadership of the National Security Council, and restored collegial relations among department heads. He reorganized the NSC organization to include a Principals Committee, Deputies Committee, and eight Policy Coordinating Committees. The NSC played an effective role during such major developments as the collapse of the Soviet Union, the unification of Germany, and the deployment of American troops in Iraq and Panama.

President Clinton's administration continued to emphasize a collegial approach within the NSC on national security matters. The NSC membership was expanded to include the Secretary of the Treasury, the U.S. Representative to the United Nations, the newly created Assistant to the President for Economic Policy (who was also head of a newly created National Economic Council or NEC, parallel to the NSC), the President's Chief of Staff, and the President's National Security Adviser.

According to a White House memorandum in January 2017, the Chairman of the Joint Chiefs of Staff and Director of National Intelligence will only sit on the Principals Committee as and when matters pertaining to them arise, but will remain part of the full National Security Council. The reorganization also placed the Administrator of the United States Agency for International Development as a permanent member of the Deputies Committee, winning moderate praise.

On April 6, 2017, the White House Chief Strategist was removed from the National Security Council and the roles of the director of national intelligence, CIA director and chairman of the Joint Chiefs of Staff were restored to the Principal's Committee.

For over 60 years, 12 Presidents have sought to use the National Security Council system to integrate foreign and defense policies in order to preserve the nation's security and advance its interests abroad. Recurrent structural modifications over the years have reflected Presidential management style, changing requirements, and personal relationships.

References

External links

History of the National Security Council 1947-1997. Office of the Historian, U.S. Department of State, August 1997.

United States National Security Council